This is a list of the 250 members of the 2003–2007 National Assembly of Serbia, as well as a list of former members of the 2003–2007 National Assembly.

The 2003–2007 National Assembly was elected in the 2003 parliamentary election, and it held its first session on 27 January 2004. The 2003–2007 National Assembly was the 6th assembly since the reestablishment of the multi-party system, after the 1990 parliamentary election.

MPs by party

List of members of the 6th National Assembly

List of former members of the 6th National Assembly

References

2003